Ombre is a 1980 Italian horror film directed and written by Giorgio Cavedon.

Production
Although best known for his erotic fumetto comic series Isabella, director and screenwriter Giorgio Cavedon had worked in the film industry making a documentary in 1953 and having some credits in the early 1960s films including directing part of the Italian comedy anthology film I soldi.

Cavedon began work on Ombre on July 9, 1979. It was filmed on location in Milan and at Icet-De Paolis Studios in Milan. It was originally developed under the working titles Autoritratto and Ritratto di fantasma. Some sources have stated that Mario Caiano was a co-director on the film. Caiano has never mentioned working on the film and actor Lou Castel stated that Cavedon was the film's only director.

Release
Ombre was distributed theatrically in Italy by Eurocopfilms on 26 June 1980. The film reportedly only sold 565 tickets in Italy and closed within a week. The film grossed a total of 1,695,000 Italian lire domestically.

Reception
In a contemporary review, Leonard Autera of Corriere della Sera stated that "Cavedon's direction [...] moves among the stories twists and certain inconsistencies in the script with mixed results." and also negatively commented on the story's slow pace.

References

Footnotes

Sources

External links
 

Italian horror films
1980 horror films
1980 films
Films shot in Milan
1980s Italian films